The Brazilian Sports Confederation (Portuguese: Confederação Brasileira de Desportos), also known by the acronym CBD, was the main sports confederation of Brazil, competent in the matter of tennis, athletics, swimming, water polo, handball, football, and any sporting activity not belonging to a self-standing institution. Football played a prominent role since the statute stated that it constituted "the basic and essential sport of the Confederação Brasileira de Desportos". The CBD was born to overcome the contrasts between the  Federação Brasileira de Futebol  (FBF) and the  Federação Brasileira de Sports  (FBS), the two bodies that competed for hegemony in the organization of football in the country, an expression of the State of Sao Paulo and State of Rio de Janeiro football movement respectively. The establishment of the CBD led to the extinction of the two state entities on 21 June 1916, and in the same year, there was affiliation to the South American Football Confederation. On 20 May 1923, it obtained affiliation to the FIFA. The Confederation also represented most of the Brazilian states in the sports sector. Today dissolved, in terms of football, its attributions and functions have been conferred on the  Confederação Brasileira de Futebol  (CBF), built in 1979.

References 

 
1916 establishments in Brazil
1979 disestablishments in Brazil